Joseph S. Maxon was a member of the Wisconsin State Assembly.

Biography
Maxon was born on November 23, 1838 in Adams, New York. In 1853, he moved to Walworth (town), Wisconsin. He became a physician by trade.

Assembly career
Maxon was elected to the Assembly in 1890. He was a Republican.

References

People from Adams, New York
People from Walworth, Wisconsin
Republican Party members of the Wisconsin State Assembly
Physicians from Wisconsin
1838 births
Year of death missing